Carson Place, also known as the Cox-Mayfield-Sutley House, is a historic mansion in Tuscaloosa, Alabama, U.S..

History
The house was first built in 1822-1825 for George Cox. Its construction was extended by John J. Webster in 1827 for his widow, Mary Cox. She extended it again in 1835 and lived in the house with her second husband and her son until 1869. It was subsequently inherited by her daughter-in-law, Sarah Cox, and it became known as The Old Carson Place. From 1923 to 1962, it belonged to Judge J. J. Mayfield. By the 1970s, it belonged to Lawrence P. Sutley.

Architectural significance
The house has been listed on the National Register of Historic Places since March 7, 1985.

References

Houses on the National Register of Historic Places in Alabama
Houses completed in 1850
Houses in Tuscaloosa, Alabama